Yair Naveh (born 5 September 1957) is a major general in the Israel Defense Forces and a former Deputy Chief of the General Staff. In 1975, he was drafted into the IDF where he served in all positions in the Golani Infantry Brigade from Company Commander to Brigade Commander. He lives in Zikhron Ya'akov.

Naveh was previously the head of Israeli Home Front Command until nominated by former Prime Minister Ariel Sharon to his post as Central Command chief. It is believed by some Israelis that Sharon nominated Naveh because he is the highest ranked religious officer and that as head of Central Command, he would be forced to carry out the evacuation of West Bank settlements in 2005.

Naveh holds a bachelor's degree in History and Political Science, as well as a master's degree in Political Science and Middle Eastern Studies.

Naveh predicted that King Abdullah would fall and that he would be Jordan's last king, drawing an angry reaction from Jordan, for which Israel had to apologize on Naveh's behalf.

In 2008 Naveh's name was tied in with the alleged instructions to assassinate commanders in Palestinian terrorist organizations contrary to a court order. This alleged involvement was revealed through the documents leaked to Haaretz journalist Uri Blau by Naveh's former secretary, Anat Kamm.

After his military service, Naveh was appointed as CEO of CityPass, the consortium building the Jerusalem Light Rail. In October 2010, Defense Minister Ehud Barak has approved the appointment of Major General Yair Naveh, 53, as IDF Deputy Chief of Staff replacing Maj.-Gen. Benny Gantz. He was recommended for the post by the IDF Chief of Staff, Lieutenant-General Gabi Ashkenazi.

On 1 February 2011, General Naveh was appointed as the stopgap IDF Chief of Staff, and was expected to succeed outgoing Chief of Staff Gen. Gabi Ashkenazi on 14 February 2011.  Naveh was appointed by Defense Minister Ehud Barak after Gen. Yoav Galant's appointment was withdrawn by Israeli Prime Minister Netanyahu. Ultimately, Benny Gantz was confirmed for the job and Naveh remained Deputy Chief of Staff until January 2013. He retired from the military in 2015.

The following is a list of positions Major General Yair Naveh has held during his service in the IDF:

 1989: Commander of the Brigade along the border with Lebanon.
 1991: Commander of the Golani Unit.
 1994: Head of Safety Department of the Ground Forces.
 1996: Chief Infantry and Paratroops officer.
 1999: Commander of the Gaza Division.
 2001: Chief of Staff of Army Headquarters.
 2003: Awarded rank of Major General and appointed as GOC Homefront Command.
 2005: Appointed GOC Central Command.
 2010: Appointed Deputy Chief of Staff of IDF.

Notes

Living people
Israeli generals
University of Haifa alumni
Tel Aviv University alumni
1957 births
People from Zikhron Ya'akov